Shalikha is an upazila of Magura District in the Division of Khulna, Bangladesh.

Geography
It has 22209 households and total area 228.64 km2.

Demographics
As of the 1991 Bangladesh census, Shalikha has a population of 132291. Males constitute 51.05% of the population, and females 48.95%. This Upazila's eighteen up population is 66748. Shalikha has an average literacy rate of 25% (7+ years), and the national average of 32.4% literate.

Administration
Shalikha Upazila is divided into seven union parishads: Arpara, Bunagati, Dhaneswargati, Gongarampur, Shalikha, Shatakhali, and Talkhari. The union parishads are subdivided into 100 mauzas and 118 villages.

See also
Upazilas of Bangladesh
Districts of Bangladesh
Divisions of Bangladesh

References

Upazilas of Magura District
Magura District
Khulna Division